Nabin Chandra Bardoloi (1875–1936) was an Indian writer, politician and leader of Indian National Congress party from Assam. An Indian independence movement activist, he was a prominent leader from Assam in the Non-cooperation movement (1920–1922) of Mahatma Gandhi. He was conferred with Karmabir title for his works and contribution towards the people of Assam. The Government of India issued a commemorative postage stamp in his honour during his birth centenary year in 1975.
His daughter Nalini Bala Devi was a noted Assamese poet and writer, who also wrote his biography, Smritir Tirtha (1948). He was the first General secretary of Assam Pradesh Congress Committee.

References

Indian independence activists from Assam
Indian National Congress politicians from Assam
Members of the Assam Legislative Assembly
1875 births
Writers from Assam
1936 deaths
Members of the Central Legislative Assembly of India